Titus is the original soundtrack to the 1999 motion picture Titus. Elliot Goldenthal wrote the score for the film, an adaptation of Shakespeare's first, and bloodiest, tragedy Titus Andronicus; written and directed by Julie Taymor, Goldenthal's long-time friend and partner. The only non-Goldenthal piece is an old Italian song called "Vivere" performed by Italian singer Carlo Buti.

The Score
It is extremely experimental, like all of his other work, and the first piece "Victorius Titus" is reminiscent of The Imperial March by John Williams in its imposing, martial nature, and (unlike imperial march) in addition uses an archaic male choir chanting in Latin.
The score blends orchestral, jazz, rock and electronica styles and complements Taymor's unique and off-beat adaptation of the Shakespearean play. In keeping with many other Goldenthal scores the orchestra used was the British London Metropolitan Orchestra. The score also contains samples from earlier Goldenthal scores, the most glaring being a reworked version of "Wreckage and Rape" from the soundtrack to Alien 3, which plays during the dinner table fight scene.

The score, according to Goldenthal himself, sums up his film scoring career up to that point; "This score is a culmination of my style. It sums up the type of work I've been doing for the past ten years."

He explains it saying,

Track listing 
 "Victorius Titus" –  2:58
 "Procession & Obsequis" –  3:00
 "Revenge Wheel" –  0:54
 "Tribute & Suffrage" –  4:17
 "Arrows of the Gods" –  1:33
 "An Offering" –  2:04
 "Crossroads" –  3:24
 "Vortex" –  1:34
 "Swing Rave" –  1:53
 "Ill-Fated Plot" –  2:20
 "Pickled Heads" –  5:05
 "Tamora's Pastorale" –  1:13
 "Titus' Vow" –  3:43
 "Mad Ole Titus" –  2:27
 "Philimelagram" –  1:46
 "Pressing Judgement" – 3:32
From A Time to Kill
 "Aaron's Plea" –  2:01
 "Coronation" –  1:54
 "Apian Stomp" –  1:32
 "Adagio" –  2:25
 "Finale" –  8:34
 "Vivere" –  3:33
By Carlo Buti

300 score controversy
The score for the 2007 film 300, composed by Tyler Bates became the subject of much criticism regarding the somewhat liberal use of other composers' orchestrations (at times note for note) including pieces from Goldenthal's Titus score; in particular "Victorius Titus" and "Finale". Warner Bros. Records released a statement clarifying the matter with regards to the similarities to Goldenthal's work:

Audio
As mentioned above, the score blends several styles of music; below are some examples of this including the two tracks concerned in the controversy with the "300" score.
 The imposing, martial opening cue used in the credits as Titus and his legions enter the arena.
 The romantic and slow paced piece used at the end of the film that slowly rises to a dramatic crescendo.
 An example of the jazz fusion used in the party scene at the Imperial Palace.

Crew/Credit
 Teese Gohl - Producer
 Joel Iwataki - Engineer
 Joel Iwataki - Mixing
 Richard Martinez - Electronic Music Producer
 Stephen McLaughlin - Engineer
 Stephen McLaughlin - Orchestration
 Vladimir Meller - Mastering
 Jonathan Sheffer - Conductor
 Elliot Goldenthal - Producer
 Elliot Goldenthal - Liner Notes
 Elliot Goldenthal - Orchestration
 Vic Fraser - Music Preparation
 Curtis Roush - Music Editor
 Julian Broad - Cover Photo
 Robert Elhai - Orchestration
 Lawrence Manchester - Engineer
 Lawrence Manchester - Music Editor
 Steven Mercurio - Conductor
 Julie Taymor - Liner Notes
 Andy Brown - Orchestra Contractor
 London Metropolitan Orchestra - Orchestra
 Page Hamilton, Mark Stewart, Andrew Hawkins, David Reid, Eric Hubel - "Guitar Orchestra" Deaf Elk
 Carlo Buti - "Vivere"
 Daryl Kell - Music Editor

References

External links
 
 Review of the score at 'Movie-Wave'.net
 Interview with Goldenthal about the score
 Page on Goldenthal's web page.

Drama film soundtracks
Elliot Goldenthal soundtracks
2000 soundtrack albums
Works based on Titus Andronicus